The 1931 Tulane Green Wave football team represented Tulane University during the 1931 Southern Conference football season. The team posted an undefeated regular season, but lost in the Rose Bowl to national champion USC. It is one of the best teams in school history.

Before the season
Jerry Dalrymple was elected captain.

Schedule

Game summaries

Ole Miss
Tulane opened the season with a 31–0 victory over Ole Miss. The starting lineup was DeColigny (left end), Cunningham (left tackle), Calhoun (left guard), Lodrigues (center), Scafide (right guard), Upton (right tackle), Dalrymple (right end), Dawson (quarterback), Glover (left halfback), Zimmerman (right halfback), Felts (fullback).

Texas A&M
In the second week of play, Tulane defeated Texas A&M 7–0. The starting lineup was DeColigny (left end), Cunningham (left tackle), Calhoun (left guard), Lodrigues (center), Scafide (right guard), Upton (right tackle), Dalrymple (right end), Dawson (quarterback), Glover (left halfback), Zimmerman (right halfback), Felts (fullback).

Spring Hill
The Spring Hill College Badgers lost to Tulane 40–0  .

Vanderbilt
Against Vanderbilt, Tulane won 19–0.

Georgia Tech
Georgia Tech was beaten 33–0.

Mississippi A&M
Mississippi A&M was beaten 59–7. The starting lineup was Haynes (left end), Bankston (left tackle), Scafide (left guard), Lodrigues (center), Calhoun (right guard), Upton (right tackle), Dalrymple (right end), Richardson (quarterback), Roberts (left halfback), Hodgins (right halfback), Lemmon (fullback).

Auburn
Don Zimmerman eclipsed 100 yards rushing in the 27–0 defeat of Auburn. Felts scored three touchdowns.

Georgia

Tulane defeated the Georgia Bulldogs 20–7. Tulane scored first on a 33-yard pass from Zimmerman to Vernon Haynes. Nollie Felts plunged in from the 1-yard line for the next touchdown. A pass from Georgia's Homey Key to Buster Mott netted 60 yards and a touchdown. After a botched punt, a double pass play led to Payne sprinting around left end for Tulane's final score.

Sewanee
Tulane shut out the Sewanee Tigers 40–0  .

LSU
Tulane defeated rival LSU 34–7. The starting lineup was Haynes (left end), DeColigny (left tackle), Scafide (left guard), Lodrigues (center), McCormick (right guard), Upton (right tackle), Dalrymple (right end), Dawson (quarterback), Zimmerman (left halfback), Glover (right halfback), Felts (fullback).

Washington State
Tulane had an intersectional victory to close the regular season, over Washington State 28–14 . Dahlen scored the first touchdown. After starting on the bench, Dalrymple rallied the team when he entered the game. A pass from Zimmerman to Haynes got the first touchdown, with Haynes tackled by Sander at the goal line.

In the second quarter, Zimmerman connected with Dawson for a long pass, pushed out of bounds at the 6-yard line. Glover then got a touchdown on a double lateral pass play, scoring with two tacklers around his neck. After a Zimmerman interception and 30-yard return, another Zimmerman to Haynes pass got another touchdown.

After a blocked punt and then a fumble by Tulane on the next drive, Washington State was in scoring distance, with Schroeder scoring on a line plunge. At the start of the fourth quarter, Dalrymple caught 25-yard touchdown despite being covered.

Postseason

Rose Bowl

Tulane lost in the Rose Bowl to Southern California by a 21–12 score. The Trojans had six All-Americans in their lineup: tackle Ernie Smith, guards Johnny Baker and Aaron "Rosy" Rosenberg, halfback Erny Pinckert and quarterbacks Orville Mohler and Gaius Shaver.

Down 21 to 0 in the third quarter, Zimmerman led a running attack which ended with a 6-yard pass to Haynes for the score. Tulane's other score was a run by "Wop" Glover set up by 11 and 15 yard passes from Zimmerman to Jerry Dalrymple. Tulane still managed a Rose Bowl record for yardage gained.

Awards and honors
One article which attempts to retroactively name Heisman Trophy winners before 1936 named Dalrymple as the recipient for 1931. He was the season's only unanimous All-American; and is still the only unanimous All-American in school history.

Felts was elected next year's captain.

Players

Line

Backfield

References

Tulane
Tulane Green Wave football seasons
Southern Conference football champion seasons
Tulane Green Wave football